Chi is an ancient center-blown transverse flute with closed ends and front finger holes.   Later it was followed by dizi.

References

Chinese musical instruments
 Flutes
Side-blown flutes
Bamboo flutes